Stop is a studio album by Don Lanphere released by Hep Records in 1983.

Track listing
"New U.S. Moon"
"Stop"
"Body and Soul"
"A.L.C."
"I Heard You Cry Last Night"
"Avalon"
"There's No You"
"The Preacher"
"Laura"
"Still Will"

Personnel
Don Lanphere — soprano saxophone, tenor saxophone
Chuck Deardorf — bass guitars
Dean Hodges — drums
Marc Seales — piano
Jonathan Pugh — trumpet

References

1983 albums
Don Lanphere albums
Hep Records albums